Charlotte J. Erickson (October 22, 1923 in Oak Park, Illinois – July 9, 2008 in Cambridge) was an American historian.

Life
Erickson was born in Oak Park, Illinois a suburb of Chicago, where her father was a Swedish Lutheran minister.  She graduated from Augustana College at Rock Island, Illinois in 1945, and from Cornell University with a MA and a PhD.

In 1944, when she attended the summer seminar of the Institute of World Affairs.
She studied at the London School of Economics, between 1948 and 1950, under the guidance of Professor T.S. Ashton and under Professor David Glass.
In 1950 to 1952, she taught at Vassar College.

She returned to England in 1952 to marry Louis Watt; they had two sons, Tom and David; but their marriage was dissolved in 1992.

In 1976–78, she was Sherman Fairchild Distinguished Scholar at the California Institute of Technology. In 1982, she was the Paul Mellon chair of American History at Cambridge University. From 1983 to 1986 she was chair of the British Association for American Studies.

Awards
 1966–67 Guggenheim Fellow in Washington D.C.
 1990 MacArthur Fellows Program

Works
 American Industry and the European Immigrant, 1860-5, Harvard University Press, 1957
British industrialists: steel and hosiery, 1850-1950 University Press, 1960
 Invisible Immigrants: the adaptation of English and Scottish immigrants in 19th-century America London School of Economics and Political Science; Weidenfeld and Nicolson, 1972, 
Leaving England: essays on British emigration in the nineteenth century, Cornell University Press, 1994,

References

1923 births
2008 deaths
Writers from Oak Park, Illinois
American expatriates in England
MacArthur Fellows
Augustana University alumni
Cornell University alumni
Vassar College faculty
California Institute of Technology faculty
Academics of the London School of Economics
20th-century American historians
American people of Swedish descent
Professors of the University of Cambridge
American women historians
20th-century American women writers
Historians from Illinois
21st-century American women